François Moncla (1 April 1932 – 28 November 2021) was a French rugby union footballer who played flanker. He won 31 caps for France between 1956 and 1961, including 18 as captain.

He was part of the France team that won the Five Nations Championship in 1959, 1960 and 1961 and that toured South-Africa in 1958, Argentina in 1960 and New-Zealand in 1961.

He won the national championship twice, in 1959 with Racing Club de France and in 1964 with Section Paloise.

Moncla worked all his life at EDF-GDF. He was married with 3 children and lived in Pau. Moncla died on 28 November 2021, at the age of 89.

References

External links
 ESPN Profile

1932 births
2021 deaths
French rugby union players
Rugby union flankers
France international rugby union players
Racing 92 players
Section Paloise players
Sportspeople from Pau, Pyrénées-Atlantiques